Euroclear is a Belgium-based financial services company that specializes in the settlement of securities transactions, as well as the safekeeping and asset servicing of these securities. It was founded in 1968 as part of J.P. Morgan & Co. to settle trades on the then developing eurobond market. It is one of two European international central securities depositories (Clearstream being the other).

Activity 

Euroclear settles domestic and international securities transactions, covering bonds, equities, derivatives, and investment funds.  Euroclear provides securities services to financial institutions located in more than 90 countries.

In addition to its role as an international central securities depository (ICSD), Euroclear also acts as the central securities depository (CSD) for Belgian, Dutch, Finnish, French, Irish, Swedish, and UK securities. Euroclear also owns EMXCo, the UK's leading provider of investment-fund order routing.

Retail investors are able to have direct accounts in local CSDs, according to local laws, rules, and procedures.

History

Early development (1968–2000) 

The Euroclear System was operated by the Belgian branch of Morgan Guaranty Trust Company from its founding in December 1968 until the start of 2001, when they transferred control to Euroclear Bank. Kidder Peabody had been the first major trading firm to tell the market that it would only deal with firms that cleared through Euroclear. Euroclear's creation provoked a reaction in Luxembourg among firms which were competitors with Morgan, and who feared that Morgan could use their settlement data to its trading advantage. This led to the launch of a competitor, Luxembourg-based Cedel, in September 1970.

Acquisitions (2001–10) 

Euroclear acquired Sicovam (the French central securities depository or CSD) in 2001, Necigef (Nederlands Centraal Instituut voor Giraal Effectenverkeer), the Dutch and CRESTCo Ltd, the CSD for UK & Irish securities using the CREST application in 2002. It acquired Caisse Interprofessionnelle de Dépôts et de Virements de Titres (CIK), the Belgian CSD, in 2007. These local CSDs were renamed as Euroclear France, Euroclear Netherlands, Euroclear UK & Ireland and Euroclear Belgium, respectively.

Euroclear also took a 20% stake in the capital of LCH.Clearnet, the UK/French entity responsible for the clearing of Euronext, London Stock Exchange and other stock exchange transactions. The CSDs of Finland (Suomen Arvopaperikeskus Oy (APK)) and Sweden (VPC AB), now operating as Euroclear Finland and Euroclear Sweden, respectively, were acquired by Euroclear in October 2008.

International development (2010–21) 

In October 2012, Euroclear granted access to Russia’s National Settlement Depository, making it easier for other countries hooked to Euroclear's system to trade with Russia, and making Russia’s capital market integrated into London's and New York's markets. 3 years later, Russia mimicked the Euroclear system to create an exchange system with China.

In May 2013, Euroclear and the US' Depository Trust and Clearing Corporation offered access to each other’s vast inventory of collaterals. While the initial offering provides a two-way automatic transfer and retention of collaterals, it is intended to evolve as a single pool of depositories.

In April 2014, Euroclear linked its system to the Central Latinoamericana de Valores to open Panama to international investors, thus creating a single pool of liquidity.

In February 2015, Mexico opened up its corporate bonds to Euroclear's trading platform, hoping it will facilitate and increase raising funds for its development programs.

In March 2016, the central bank of France linked with Euroclear for securities lending, and with the Mexican Stock Exchange to connect the Mexican mutual funds market with the Belgian trade company.

2022: Aftermath of Russian invasion of Ukraine
In an article in Foreign Affairs and in a subsequent interview, economist Benn Steil, a senior fellow and director of international economics at Council on Foreign Relations (CFR), and CFR analyst Benjamin Della Rocca argued that Russia may have - in transactions executed through the Central Bank of China and then likely through Chinese state-owned banks as intermediaries - deposited $80 billion in U.S. Treasury bonds at Euroclear in the buildup to the 2022 Russian invasion of Ukraine.

The Russian depository blocked and froze all securities held in Euroclear's account at the Russian depository, on March 1, 2022. The Russian depository also froze payments on securities of Russian issuers from being made to foreign individuals and entities.

On March 18, 2022, Euroclear restricted operations on the account of the Russian National Settlement Depository; it stopped executing any instructions to carry out transactions with securities and money, including instructions to participate in corporate actions on foreign securities.

Euroclear also disabled its ruble accounts with ING Bank in Russia and Russia's VIB Bank, the result of which was that its clients are no longer allowed to transfer any rubles, and the ruble bridge between Clearstream and Euroclear was closed. Furthermore, Euroclear stopped settling trades in Russian securities.

Involvement in sovereign credit events

Argentina 
On 25 March 2015, New York federal judge Thomas Griesa ordered Euroclear to stop processing payments of Argentina's debt bonds. This court injunction follows Argentina's decade-long dispute with its creditors. The next day, the trading bridge between Euroclear and Clearstream on those Argentine bonds were also shuttered until further notice. The intent of this injunction was to force Argentina to fully pay their creditors in order to gain back access to its bond-selling program.

Greece 
In April 2012, Euroclear participated in the restructuring of the Greek debt by swapping 41 billion euros of Greek bonds, which represented about a third of the foreigner-held Greek debt.

Russia 

In June 2022, Euroclear participated in blocking Russian funds resulting in a default of bond repayment.

Governance 
In 2005, a new Belgian holding company, Euroclear SA/NV, was created as the owner of all the shared technology and services supplied to each of the Euroclear CSDs and the ICSD.

In January 2010, Tim Howell became CEO of Euroclear, replacing Pierre Francotte whose tenure lasted 10 years.
On 1 January 2017, Lieve Mostrey was officially appointed CEO of Euroclear, replacing Tim Howell.

In 2015, Euroclear reported €27.5 trillion in safekept clients assets, and €674.7 trillion in annually traded assets.

Each of the Euroclear CSDs are regulated by the relevant authorities within their respective home countries. Incorporated in Belgium, Euroclear SA/NV is subject to the supervision of the Belgium Financial Services and Markets Authority (FSMA). The National Bank of Belgium (NBB) also has oversight. Euroclear plc is authorised as a service company by the Financial Conduct Authority in the United Kingdom.

See also 
 Clearstream
 Custodian bank
 Depository Trust & Clearing Corporation
 Regulatory Impact Assessment

References

External links 

T2S Project of the Eurosystem

Capital markets of Europe
Financial services companies of Belgium
Financial services companies established in 1968
Central securities depositories
Securities clearing and depository institutions